De l'amour le mieux is the third studio album by Natasha St-Pier, released in 2002. It achieved great success in France, Belgium (Wallonia) and Switzerland.

Track listings

French version

 "Tu trouveras" (single) (Lionel Florence, Pascal Obispo) — 4:58
 "Nos rendez-vous" (single) (Patrice Guirao, Giacchino Maurici, Volodia) — 3:04
 "Grandir c'est dire je t'aime" (David Gategno, Marie-Jo Zarb) — 3:32
 "Tous les au-revoir se ressemblent" (Florence, Gategno, Maurici) — 3:43
 "Alors on se raccroche" (single) (Florence, Maurici, Obispo) — 4:06
 "Les chansons ne servent à rien" (Florence, Gategno) — 3:30
 "De l'amour le mieux" (Florence, Obispo) — 4:13
 "Pourquoi tant de larmes" (Kapler, Fred Kocourek) — 3:58
 "Toi qui manque à ma vie" (Calogero Bros, Julie D'aimé) — 3:20
 "On peut tout essayer" (Frédéric Doll, Volodia) — 3:52
 "Les diamants sont solitaires" (Calogero, Florence, Obispo, Zarb) — 4:27
 "Qu'est-ce qui nous empêche" (David Manet, Christian Vie) — 4:03
 "L'amour emporte tout" (Didier Golemanas, Daniel Seff) — 4:13
 "Là-bas" (feat. Florent Pagny) (Jean-Jacques Goldman) — 5:08

Spanish version

 "Encontrarás" (feat. Miguel Bosé, Spanish version of "Tu Trouveras") Single #2 Spain
 "Cita Sin Amor" (Spanish version of "Nos rendez-vous")
 "Por probarlo todo no se pierde nada" (Spanish version of "On peut tout essayer")
 "Tous les au-revoir se ressemblent"
 "Grandir c'est dire je t'aime"
 "Alors on se raccroche"
 "Les Chansons ne servent à rien"
 "De l'amour le mieux"
 "Tu trouveras"
 "Qu'est-ce qui nous empêche"
 "L'amour emporte tout"
 "Là-bas"
 "Toi qui manque à ma vie"
 "Nos rendez-vous"

Canadian version

 "Tu trouveras" (single)
 "Nos rendez-vous" (single)
 "Grandir c'est dire je t'aime"
 "Tous les au-revoir se ressemblent"
 "Alors on se raccroche" (single)
 "Les chansons ne servent à rien"
 "De l'amour le mieux"
 "Pourquot tant de larmes"
 "Enlève ton blouson" (Bonus Canada)
 "Toi qui manque à ma vie"
 "On peut tout essayer"
 "Les diamants sont solitaires"
 "Qu'est-ce qui nous empêche"
 "L'amour emporte tout"
 "Là-bas" (feat. Florent Pagny)

Japanese version

 "Tu trouveras"
 "Nos rendez-vous"
 "Grandir c’est dire je t’aime"
 "Tous les au-revoir se ressemblent"
 "Alors on se raccroche"
 "Les chansons ne servent à rien"
 "De l’amour le mieux"
 "Pourquoi tant de larmes"
 "Toi qui manque à ma vie"
 "On peut tout essayer"
 "Les diamants sont solitaires"
 "Qu’est-ce qui nous empêche"
 "L'amour emporte tout"
 "Là-bas" (feat. Florent Pagny)
 "All I Have Is My Soul" (Bonus Japan)

Personnel 

Rick Allison – Piano, Arranger, Programming, Realization
Denis Benarrosch – Percussion
Laurent Coppola – Drums
Denis Courchesne – Drums
Patrice Cramer – Mixing
Jean Yves d'Angelo – Piano, Fender Rhodes
Chistopher Deschamps – Drums
Claude Engel – Guitar (Acoustic)
Steve Forward – Mixing
Bruce Gaitsch – Guitar, Engineer
David Gategno – Guitar (Acoustic), Assistant Publisher
Rob Heaney – Engineer
Raphael Jonin – Mastering
Julie Leblanc – Choeurs
Basil Leroux – Guitar (Electric)
Stephane Levy B – Engineer
Rémy Malo – Basse
Pascal Obispo – Guitar (Acoustic), Choeurs, Realization
Christian St-Germain – Programming, Engineer, Pro-Tools
Natasha St. Pier – Choeurs
Sébastien Surel – Arranger
Sébastien Surel – Arranger
Cyril Tarquiny – Guitar (Acoustic), Guitar (Electric)
Volodia – Engineer, Mixing, Realization
Volt – Photography

Charts

Certifications

References

2002 albums
2003 albums
Natasha St-Pier albums
Sony Music France albums